Odonthalitus poas is a species of moth of the family Tortricidae. It is found in Costa Rica.

The forewings are white with brown transverse striae. The hindwings are dingy white with pale grey-brown mottling.

Etymology
The species name refers to the collecting locality of most specimens on the slope of Poás Volcano in Costa Rica.

References

Moths described in 2000
Euliini